is a former Japanese football player he is currently manager Japan Football League club Verspah Oita.

Playing career
Yamahashi was born in Sapporo on May 31, 1972. After graduating from high school, he joined Yanmar Diesel (later Cerezo Osaka) in 1991. He played many matches as forward and offensive midfielder. The club won the champions in 1994 and was promoted to J1 League from 1995. Although he played many matches as substitute in 1995, his opportunity to play decreased in 1996. In 1997, he moved to his local club Consadole Sapporo in Japan Football League. He played many matches and the club won the champions in 1997 and was promoted to J1 from 1998. However he could hardly play in the match in 1998 and retired end of 1998 season.

Coaching career
After having worked with the Japan Football Association and a local team in Hokkaido, Takahashi was named the head coach of Verspah Oita for 2021 season.

Club statistics

References

External links

1972 births
Living people
Association football people from Hokkaido
Japanese footballers
Japan Soccer League players
J1 League players
Japan Football League (1992–1998) players
Cerezo Osaka players
Hokkaido Consadole Sapporo players
Association football forwards
Sportspeople from Sapporo